Freshwater Point is a coastal locality in the Mackay Region, Queensland, Australia.

History 
The locality was named and bounded on 4 June 1999. It presumably takes its name from the geographic feature of the same name.

References 

Mackay Region
Coastline of Queensland
Localities in Queensland